Seventeen elements or nutrients are essential for plant growth and reproduction. They are carbon (C), hydrogen (H), oxygen (O), nitrogen (N), phosphorus (P), potassium (K), sulfur (S), calcium (Ca), magnesium (Mg), iron (Fe), boron (B), manganese (Mn), copper (Cu), zinc (Zn), molybdenum (Mo), nickel (Ni) and chlorine (Cl). Nutrients required for plants to complete their life cycle are considered essential nutrients. Nutrients that enhance the growth of plants but are not necessary to complete the plant's life cycle are considered non-essential. With the exception of carbon, hydrogen and oxygen, which are supplied by carbon dioxide and water, and nitrogen, provided through nitrogen fixation, the nutrients derive originally from the mineral component of the soil. The Law of the Minimum expresses that when the available form of a nutrient is not in enough proportion in the soil solution, then other nutrients cannot be taken up at an optimum rate by a plant. A particular nutrient ratio of the soil solution is thus mandatory for optimizing plant growth, a value which might differ from nutrient ratios calculated from plant composition.

Plant uptake of nutrients can only proceed when they are present in a plant-available form. In most situations, nutrients are absorbed in an ionic form from (or together with) soil water. Although minerals are the origin of most nutrients, and the bulk of most nutrient elements in the soil is held in crystalline form within primary and secondary minerals, they weather too slowly to support rapid plant growth. For example, the application of finely ground minerals, feldspar and apatite, to soil seldom provides the necessary amounts of potassium and phosphorus at a rate sufficient for good plant growth, as most of the nutrients remain bound in the crystals of those minerals.

The nutrients adsorbed onto the surfaces of clay colloids and soil organic matter provide a more accessible reservoir of many plant nutrients (e.g. K, Ca, Mg, P, Zn). As plants absorb the nutrients from the soil water, the soluble pool is replenished from the surface-bound pool. The decomposition of soil organic matter by microorganisms is another mechanism whereby the soluble pool of nutrients is replenished – this is important for the supply of plant-available N, S, P, and B from soil.

Gram for gram, the capacity of humus to hold nutrients and water is far greater than that of clay minerals, most of the soil cation exchange capacity arising from charged carboxylic groups on organic matter. However, despite the great capacity of humus to retain water once water-soaked, its high hydrophobicity decreases its wettability. All in all, small amounts of humus may remarkably increase the soil's capacity to promote plant growth.

Uptake processes 
Nutrients in the soil are taken up by the plant through its roots, and in particular its root hairs. To be taken up by a plant, a nutrient element must be located near the root surface; however, the supply of nutrients in contact with the root is rapidly depleted within a distance of ca. 2 mm. There are three basic mechanisms whereby nutrient ions dissolved in the soil solution are brought into contact with plant roots:

 Mass flow of water
 Diffusion within water
 Interception by root growth

All three mechanisms operate simultaneously, but one mechanism or another may be most important for a particular nutrient. For example, in the case of calcium, which is generally plentiful in the soil solution, except when aluminium over competes calcium on cation exchange sites in very acid soils (pH less than 4), mass flow alone can usually bring sufficient amounts to the root surface. However, in the case of phosphorus, diffusion is needed to supplement mass flow. For the most part, nutrient ions must travel some distance in the soil solution to reach the root surface. This movement can take place by mass flow, as when dissolved nutrients are carried along with the soil water flowing toward a root that is actively drawing water from the soil. In this type of movement, the nutrient ions are somewhat analogous to leaves floating down a stream. In addition, nutrient ions continually move by diffusion from areas of greater concentration toward the nutrient-depleted areas of lower concentration around the root surface. That process is due to random motion, also called Brownian motion, of molecules within a gradient of decreasing concentration. By this means, plants can continue to take up nutrients even at night, when water is only slowly absorbed into the roots as transpiration has almost stopped following stomatal closure. Finally, root interception comes into play as roots continually grow into new, undepleted soil. By this way roots are also able to absorb nanomaterials such as nanoparticulate organic matter.

In the above table, phosphorus and potassium nutrients move more by diffusion than they do by mass flow in the soil water solution, as they are rapidly taken up by the roots creating a concentration of almost zero near the roots (the plants cannot transpire enough water to draw more of those nutrients near the roots). The very steep concentration gradient is of greater influence in the movement of those ions than is the movement of those by mass flow. The movement by mass flow requires the transpiration of water from the plant causing water and solution ions to also move toward the roots. Movement by root interception is slowest as the plants must extend their roots.

Plants move ions out of their roots in an effort to move nutrients in from the soil, an exchange process which occurs in the root apoplast. Hydrogen H+ is exchanged for other cations, and carbonate (HCO3−) and hydroxide (OH−) anions are exchanged for nutrient anions. As plant roots remove nutrients from the soil water solution, they are replenished as other ions move off of clay and humus (by ion exchange or desorption), are added from the weathering of soil minerals, and are released by the decomposition of soil organic matter. However, the rate at which plant roots remove nutrients may not cope with the rate at which they are replenished in the soil solution, stemming in nutrient limitation to plant growth. Plants derive a large proportion of their anion nutrients from decomposing organic matter, which typically holds about 95 percent of the soil nitrogen, 5 to 60 percent of the soil phosphorus and about 80 percent of the soil sulfur. Where crops are produced, the replenishment of nutrients in the soil must usually be augmented by the addition of fertilizer or organic matter.

Because nutrient uptake is an active metabolic process, conditions that inhibit root metabolism may also inhibit nutrient uptake. Examples of such conditions include waterlogging or soil compaction resulting in poor soil aeration, excessively high or low soil temperatures, and above-ground conditions that result in low translocation of sugars to plant roots.

Carbon 

Plants obtain their carbon from atmospheric carbon dioxide through photosynthetic carboxylation, to which must be added the uptake of dissolved carbon from the soil solution and carbon transfer through mycorrhizal networks. About 45% of a plant's dry mass is carbon; plant residues typically have a carbon to nitrogen ratio (C/N) of between 13:1 and 100:1. As the soil organic material is digested by micro-organisms and saprophagous soil fauna, the C/N decreases as the carbonaceous material is metabolized and carbon dioxide (CO2) is released as a byproduct which then finds its way out of the soil and into the atmosphere. Nitrogen turnover (mostly involved in protein turnover) is lesser than that of carbon (mostly involved in respiration) in the living, then dead matter of decomposers, which are always richer in nitrogen than plant litter, and so it builds up in the soil. Normal CO2 concentration in the atmosphere is 0.03%, this can be the factor limiting plant growth. In a field of maize on a still day during high light conditions in the growing season, the CO2 concentration drops very low, but under such conditions the crop could use up to 20 times the normal concentration. The respiration of CO2 by soil micro-organisms decomposing soil organic matter and the CO2 respired by roots contribute an important amount of CO2 to the photosynthesising plants, to which must be added the CO2 respired by aboveground plant tissues. Root-respired CO2 can be accumulated overnight within hollow stems of plants, to be further used for photosynthesis during the day. Within the soil, CO2 concentration is 10 to 100 times that of atmospheric levels but may rise to toxic levels if the soil porosity is low or if diffusion is impeded by flooding.

Nitrogen 

Nitrogen is the most critical element obtained by plants from the soil, to the exception of moist tropical forests where phosphorus is the limiting soil nutrient, and nitrogen deficiency often limits plant growth. Plants can use the nitrogen as either the ammonium cation (NH4+) or the anion nitrate (NO3−). Plants are commonly classified as ammonium or nitrate plants according to their preferential nitrogen nutrition. Usually, most of the nitrogen in soil is bound within organic compounds that make up the soil organic matter, and must be mineralized to the ammonium or nitrate form before it can be taken up by most plants. However, symbiosis with mycorrhizal fungi allow plants to get access to the organic nitrogen pool where and when mineral forms of nitrogen are poorly available. The total nitrogen content depends largely on the soil organic matter content, which in turn depends on texture, climate, vegetation, topography, age and soil management. Soil nitrogen typically decreases by 0.2 to 0.3% for every temperature increase by 10 °C. Usually, grassland soils contain more soil nitrogen than forest soils, because of a higher turnover rate of grassland organic matter. Cultivation decreases soil nitrogen by exposing soil organic matter to decomposition by microorganisms, most losses being caused by denitrification, and soils under no-tillage maintain more soil nitrogen than tilled soils.

Some micro-organisms are able to metabolise organic matter and release ammonium in a process called mineralisation. Others, called nitrifiers, take free ammonium or nitrite as an intermediary step in the process of nitrification, and oxidise it to nitrate. Nitrogen-fixing bacteria are capable of metabolising N2 into the form of ammonia or related nitrogenous compounds in a process called nitrogen fixation. Both ammonium and nitrate can be immobilized by their incorporation into microbial living cells, where it is temporarily sequestered in the form of amino acids and proteins. Nitrate may be lost from the soil to the atmosphere when bacteria metabolise it to the gases NH3, N2 and N2O, a process called denitrification. Nitrogen may also be leached from the vadose zone if in the form of nitrate, acting as a pollutant if it reaches the water table or flows over land, more especially in agricultural soils under high use of nutrient fertilizers. Ammonium may also be sequestered in 2:1 clay minerals. A small amount of nitrogen is added to soil by rainfall, to the exception of wide areas of North America and West Europe where the excess use of nitrogen fertilizers and manure has caused atmospheric pollution by ammonia emission, stemming in soil acidification and eutrophication of soils and aquatic ecosystems.

Gains 
In the process of mineralisation, microbes feed on organic matter, releasing ammonia (NH3), ammonium (NH4+), nitrate (NO3−) and other nutrients. As long as the carbon to nitrogen ratio (C/N) of fresh residues in the soil is above 30:1, nitrogen will be in short supply for the nitrogen-rich microbal biomass (nitrogen deficiency), and other bacteria will uptake ammonium and to a lesser extent nitrate and incorporate them into their cells in the immobilization process. In that form the nitrogen is said to be immobilised. Later, when such bacteria die, they too are mineralised and some of the nitrogen is released as ammonium and nitrate. Predation of bacteria by soil fauna, in particular protozoa and nematodes, play a decisive role in the return of immobilized nitrogen to mineral forms. If the C/N of fresh residues is less than 15, mineral nitrogen is freed to the soil and directly available to plants. Bacteria may on average add  nitrogen per acre, and in an unfertilised field, this is the most important source of usable nitrogen. In a soil with 5% organic matter perhaps 2 to 5% of that is released to the soil by such decomposition. It occurs fastest in warm, moist, well aerated soil. The mineralisation of 3% of the organic material of a soil that is 4% organic matter overall, would release  of nitrogen as ammonium per acre.

In nitrogen fixation, rhizobium bacteria convert N2 to ammonia (NH3), which is rapidly converted to amino acids, parts of which are used by the rhizobia for the synthesis of their own biomass proteins, while other parts are transported to the xylem of the host plant. Rhizobia share a symbiotic relationship with host plants, since rhizobia supply the host with nitrogen and the host provides rhizobia with other nutrients and a safe environment. It is estimated that such symbiotic bacteria in the root nodules of legumes add 45 to 250 pounds of nitrogen per acre per year, which may be sufficient for the crop. Other, free-living nitrogen-fixing diazotroph bacteria and archaea live independently in the soil and release mineral forms of nitrogen when their dead bodies are converted by way of mineralization.

Some amount of usable nitrogen is fixed by lightning as nitric oxide (NO) and nitrogen dioxide (NO2−). Nitrogen dioxide is soluble in water to form nitric acid (HNO3) dissociating in H+ and NO3−. Ammonia, NH3, previously emitted from the soil, may fall with precipitation as nitric acid at a rate of about five pounds nitrogen per acre per year.

Sequestration 
When bacteria feed on soluble forms of nitrogen (ammonium and nitrate), they temporarily sequester that nitrogen in their bodies in a process called immobilization. At a later time when those bacteria die, their nitrogen may be released as ammonium by the process of mineralization, sped up by predatory fauna.

Protein material is easily broken down, but the rate of its decomposition is slowed by its attachment to the crystalline structure of clay and when trapped between the clay layers or attached to rough clay surfaces. The layers are small enough that bacteria cannot enter. Some organisms can exude extracellular enzymes that can act on the sequestered proteins. However, those enzymes too may be trapped on the clay crystals, resulting in a complex interaction between proteins, microbial enzymes and mineral surfaces.

Ammonium fixation occurs mainly between the layers of 2:1 type clay minerals such as illite, vermiculite or montmorillonite, together with ions of similar ionic radius and low hydration energy such as potassium, but a small proportion of ammonium is also fixed in the silt fraction. Only a small fraction of soil nitrogen is held this way.

Losses 
Usable nitrogen may be lost from soils when it is in the form of nitrate, as it is easily leached, contrary to ammonium which is easily fixed. Further losses of nitrogen occur by denitrification, the process whereby soil bacteria convert nitrate (NO3−) to nitrogen gas, N2 or N2O. This occurs when poor soil aeration limits free oxygen, forcing bacteria to use the oxygen in nitrate for their respiratory process. Denitrification increases when oxidisable organic material is available, as in organic farming and when soils are warm and slightly acidic, as currently happens in tropical areas. Denitrification may vary throughout a soil as the aeration varies from place to place. Denitrification may cause the loss of 10 to 20 percent of the available nitrates within a day and when conditions are favourable to that process, losses of up to 60 percent of nitrate applied as fertiliser may occur.

Ammonia volatilisation occurs when ammonium reacts chemically with an alkaline soil, converting NH4+ to NH3. The application of ammonium fertiliser to such a field can result in volatilisation losses of as much as 30 percent.

All kinds of nitrogen losses, whether by leaching or volatilization, are responsible for a large part of aquifer pollution and air pollution, with concomitant effects on soil acidification and eutrophication, a novel combination of environmental threats (acidity and excess nitrogen) to which extant organisms are badly adapted, causing severe biodiversity losses in natural ecosystems.

Phosphorus 
After nitrogen, phosphorus is probably the element most likely to be deficient in soils, although it often turns to be the most deficient in tropical soils where the mineral pool is depleted under intense leaching and mineral weathering while, contrary to nitrogen, phosphorus reserves cannot be replenished from other sources. The soil mineral apatite is the most common mineral source of phosphorus, from which it can be extracted by microbial and root exudates, with an important contribution of arbuscular mycorrhizal fungi. The most common form of organic phosphate is phytate, the principal storage form of phosphorus in many plant tissues. While there is on average 1000 lb per acre (1120 kg per hectare) of phosphorus in the soil, it is generally in the form of orthophosphate with low solubility, except when linked to ammonium or calcium, hence the use of diammonium phosphate or monocalcium phosphate as fertilizers. Total phosphorus is about 0.1 percent by weight of the soil, but only one percent of that is directly available to plants. Of the part available, more than half comes from the mineralisation of organic matter. Agricultural fields may need to be fertilised to make up for the phosphorus that has been removed in the crop.

When phosphorus does form solubilised ions of H2PO4−, if not taken up by plant roots they rapidly form insoluble phosphates of calcium or hydrous oxides of iron and aluminum. Phosphorus is largely immobile in the soil and is not leached but actually builds up in the surface layer if not cropped. The application of soluble fertilisers to soils may result in zinc deficiencies as zinc phosphates form, but soil pH levels, partly depending on the form of phosphorus in the fertiliser, strongly interact with this effect, in some cases resulting in increased zinc availability. Lack of phosphorus may interfere with the normal opening of the plant leaf stomata, decreased stomatal conductance resulting in decreased photosynthesis and respiration rates while decreased transpiration increases plant temperature. Phosphorus is most available when soil pH is 6.5 in mineral soils and 5.5 in organic soils.

Potassium 
The amount of potassium in a soil may be as much as 80,000 lb per acre-foot, of which only 150 lb is available for plant growth. Common mineral sources of potassium are the mica biotite and potassium feldspar, KAlSi3O8. Rhizosphere bacteria, also called rhizobacteria, contribute through the production of organic acids to its solubilization. When solubilised, half will be held as exchangeable cations on clay while the other half is in the soil water solution. Potassium fixation often occurs when soils dry and the potassium is bonded between layers of 2:1 expansive clay minerals such as illite, vermiculite or montmorillonite. Under certain conditions, dependent on the soil texture, intensity of drying, and initial amount of exchangeable potassium, the fixed percentage may be as much as 90 percent within ten minutes. Potassium may be leached from soils low in clay.

Calcium 
Calcium is one percent by weight of soils and is generally available but may be low as it is soluble and can be leached. It is thus low in sandy and heavily leached soil or strongly acidic mineral soils, resulting in excessive concentration of free hydrogen ions in the soil solution, and therefore these soils require liming. Calcium is supplied to the plant in the form of exchangeable ions and moderately soluble minerals. There are four forms of calcium in the soil. Soil calcium can be in insoluble forms such as calcite or dolomite, in the soil solution in the form of a divalent cation or retained in exchangeable form at the surface of mineral particles. Another form is when calcium complexes with organic matter, forming covalent bonds between organic compounds which contribute to structural stability. Calcium is more available on the soil colloids than is potassium because the common mineral calcite, CaCO3, is more soluble than potassium-bearing minerals such as feldspar.

Calcium uptake by roots is essential for plant nutrition, contrary to an old tenet that it was luxury consumption. Calcium is considered as an essential component of plant cell membranes, a counterion for inorganic and organic anions in the vacuole, and an intracellular messenger in the cytosol, playing a role in cellular learning and memory.

Magnesium 
Magnesium is one of the dominant exchangeable cations in most soils (after calcium and potassium). Magnesium is an essential element for plants, microbes and animals, being involved in many catalytic reactions and in the synthesis of chlorophyll. Primary minerals that weather to release magnesium include hornblende, biotite and vermiculite. Soil magnesium concentrations are generally sufficient for optimal plant growth, but highly weathered and sandy soils may be magnesium deficient due to leaching by heavy precipitation.

Sulfur 
Most sulfur is made available to plants, like phosphorus, by its release from decomposing organic matter. Deficiencies may exist in some soils (especially sandy soils) and if cropped, sulfur needs to be added. The application of large quantities of nitrogen to fields that have marginal amounts of sulfur may cause sulfur deficiency by a dilution effect when stimulation of plant growth by nitrogen increases the plant demand for sulfur. A 15-ton crop of onions uses up to 19 lb of sulfur and 4 tons of alfalfa uses 15 lb per acre. Sulfur abundance varies with depth. In a sample of soils in Ohio, United States, the sulfur abundance varied with depths, 0–6 inches, 6–12 inches, 12–18 inches, 18–24 inches in the amounts: 1056, 830, 686, 528 lb per acre respectively.

Micronutrients 
The micronutrients essential in plant life, in their order of importance, include iron, manganese, zinc, copper, boron, chlorine and molybdenum. The term refers to plants' needs, not to their abundance in soil. They are required in very small amounts but are essential to plant health in that most are required parts of enzyme systems which are involved in plant metabolism. They are generally available in the mineral component of the soil, but the heavy application of phosphates can cause a deficiency in zinc and iron by the formation of insoluble zinc and iron phosphates. Iron deficiency, stemming in plant chlorosis and rhizosphere acidification, may also result from excessive amounts of heavy metals or calcium minerals (lime) in the soil. Excess amounts of soluble boron, molybdenum and chloride are toxic.

Non-essential nutrients 
Nutrients which enhance the health but whose deficiency does not stop the life cycle of plants include: cobalt, strontium, vanadium, silicon and nickel. As their importance is evaluated they may be added to the list of essential plant nutrients, as is the case for silicon.

See also
 Alkali soil
 Sodic soils
 Cation-exchange capacity
 Soil contamination
 Soil fertility
 Index of soil-related articles

References

Bibliography

 
 
 
 
 
 
 
 
 
 
 
 
 
 
 
 
 
 
 
 
 
 
 
 

Soil
Plant nutrition